2024 Summer Olympics marketing has been a long running campaign that began since Paris won its bid to host the games in 2017.

Symbols

Emblem
The emblem for the 2024 Summer Olympics and Paralympics was unveiled on 21 October 2019 at the Grand Rex. Inspired by Art Deco, it is a representation of Marianne, the national personification of France, with a flame formed in negative space by its hair. The emblem also resembles a gold medal. Tony Estanguet explained that the emblem symbolised "the power and the magic of the Games", and the Games being "for people". The use of a female figure also serves as an homage to the 1900 Summer Olympics in Paris, which were the first to allow women to participate.

The emblem for Paris 2024 was considering as the biggest new logo release of 2019 by many design magazines. An Opinion Way survey shows that 83 per cent of French people say they like the new Paris 2024 Games emblem. Approval ratings were high, with 82 per cent finding it aesthetically appealing and 78 per cent creative.

It was, however, met with some mockery on social media, with some commenting that the logo "would be better suited to a dating site or a hair salon".

For the first time, the 2024 Summer Paralympics will share the same logo as their corresponding Olympics with no difference, reflecting a shared "ambition" between both events. The emblem was designed by the French agencies Ecobranding & Royalties.

Mascots

The Phryges, the hat-like mascots, was unveiled on 14 November 2022

Corporate sponsorship

See also 

 2008 Summer Olympics marketing
 2012 Summer Olympics marketing
 2016 Summer Olympics marketing
 2020 Summer Olympics marketing

References

Marketing
Olympic marketing